KZMG (102.7 FM) is a radio station licensed to Melba, Idaho, United States.

KZMG broadcasts in HD Radio.

History
The KZMG call letters belonged to a top 40 radio station that later became KTIK-FM.  
KZMG's present frequency was originally owned by College Creek Media, LLC. The principal person in interest for College Creek Media was Christopher F Devine.  In late 2011, ownership was transferred to Twin Peaks Radio, LLC, whose principal person in interest is Dale A. Ganske.  Twin Peaks Radio, LLC and Northern Nevada Media, LLC (Principal person in interest Fred Weinberg) applied to the FCC to transfer the license, which the FCC approved, but the sale was never consummated.

On October 24, 2012, the sale of the then-KPHD to Lisa Kirkman's KPHD Radio, LLC was consummated at a purchase price of $35,000. On February 20, 2013, a further sale of the station by KPHD Radio to Kevin Terry's JLD Media, LLC was consummated at a purchase price of $90,000.

At some point, an application was filed with the Federal Communications Commission to move the then silent KPHD from Elko, NV on 97.5 to Melba, ID at 102.7. That permit was conditioned on several other stations changing their facilities. On October 31, 2013, at 5 PM, KSAS-FM Caldwell, ID moved from 103.3 to 103.5, and KZNO Jerome, ID moved from 102.9 to 103.1 to make room for the new station. On November 11, 2013, the station changed its call sign from KPHD to the current KZMG. On December 9, 2013, the station signed on as "My 102.7 FM", broadcasting a hot adult contemporary format.

On February 21, 2014, JLD Media sold KZMG to FM Idaho CO., LLC at a purchase price of $800,000.

References

http://radioinsight.com/blog/headlines/86969/flip-move-sales-in-boise/
http://rbr.com/kzmg-fm-sold-to-fm-idaho-via-boise-move-in/
http://blogs.idahostatesman.com/listen-online-new-fm-station-my-102-7-fm-hits-treasure-valley-airwaves-commercial-free/

External links

My 102.7 on Twitter

ZMG
Hot adult contemporary radio stations in the United States